Medina Deme Armino is an Ethiopian long-distance runner. In 2019 and 2020 she won the Xiamen International Marathon held in Xiamen, China. In 2019, she won with a time of 2:27:25 and in 2020 she improved her time to 2:26:12.

In 2018, she won the Treviso Marathon held in Treviso, Italy with a time of 2:33:17. In that same year, she also won the Beirut Marathon held in Beirut, Lebanon with a time of 2:29:30.

Achievements

References

External links 
 

Living people
Year of birth missing (living people)
Place of birth missing (living people)
Ethiopian female long-distance runners
21st-century Ethiopian women